Nick Schenk (born November 12, 1965) is an American screenwriter known for writing the Clint Eastwood-directed feature film Gran Torino in 2008 for which he won Best Original Screenplay from the National Board of Review. He continued his collaborations with Eastwood on The Mule (2018) and Cry Macho (2021).

Early life
Schenk was born in Minneapolis, Minnesota and grew up in the neighboring city of Fridley. He graduated from the Minneapolis College of Art and Design in 1989.

Career
During the mid-1990s, he played the character of Butch the Janitor on the television series, Let's Bowl, during its initial syndicated run.  He went on to be a writer for the series during its run on Comedy Central from 2001-2002.  He also made appearances in small roles during this time.

In 2007, Nick Schenk was a writer and producer for Bodog Fight (the mixed-martial arts competition television show) when his screenplay for Gran Torino was optioned by Jenette Kahn.  When Clint Eastwood read it, he not only decided to direct and star in it but he also insisted that not a word be changed by the studio. Subsequently the only script changes made were to tailor it to the location where it was shot (Michigan) as opposed to Minnesota where it was originally set.

On February 26, 2021, Nick signed on with the representative company Management 360.

On January 20, 2022, it was announced that Schenk will write and executive produce a sequel to the 1983 film A Christmas Story entitled A Christmas Story Christmas for Warner Bros. Pictures and HBO Max.

Filmography

Films

Television

References

Further reading
 Tapley, Kristopher. - PAGE TO SCREEN: "Gran Torino" by Nick Schenk. - InContention.com. - September 9, 2008.
 Covert, Colin. - "A Twin Cities writer's 'Gran' slam". -  Star Tribune. - January 8, 2009.
 Schein, Louisa. - "Eastwood’s Next Film Features Hmong American Cast: Exclusive Interviews From the Set of 'Gran Torino'". - AsianWeek. - October 3, 2008.

External links 
 
 
 

1965 births
Living people
American male screenwriters
American male television actors
American television writers
American male television writers
Minneapolis College of Art and Design alumni
Screenwriters from Minnesota
Writers from Minneapolis